Øvre Birtedalen is a village in Fyresdal Municipality in Vestfold og Telemark county, Norway. The area has a lot of holiday cottages.

References

Fyresdal
Villages in Vestfold og Telemark